Holladay is a city in central Salt Lake County, Utah, United States. It is part of the Salt Lake City, Utah Metropolitan Statistical Area and abuts the Wasatch National Forest. The population was 31,965 at the 2020 census, a significant increase from 14,561 in 2000 when the first area incorporated from Salt Lake County. The city was incorporated on November 29, 1999, as Holladay-Cottonwood, and the name was shortened to Holladay on December 14 of that year. It was reported in the 1990 census as the Holladay-Cottonwood CDP.

History

On July 29, 1847 a group of Mormon pioneers (members of the Church of Jesus Christ of Latter-day Saints) known as the Mississippi Company, among them John Holladay of Alabama, entered the Salt Lake Valley. Within weeks after their arrival, they discovered a free-flowing, spring-fed stream, which they called Spring Creek (near what is now Kentucky Avenue). While most of the group returned to the main settlement in Salt Lake City for the winter, two or three men built dugouts along this stream and wintered over. Thus, this became the first village established away from Salt Lake City itself. In the spring, a number of families hurried out to build homes and tame the land. There were numerous springs and ponds here and grasses and wild flowers were abundant, making this a desirable area for settlement.

When John Holladay was named as the branch president of The Church of Jesus Christ of Latter-day Saints, the village took upon itself the name of Holladay's Settlement or Holladay's Burgh. John Holladay's family dates to the early 18th century in Virginia. His ancestors were signers of the South Carolina Declaration of Independence and fought in the Revolutionary War. He is a cousin to Ben Holladay, The Stagecoach King, who traded with the LDS and ran his Denver-San Francisco stage line through Salt Lake. It is not known if they were in contact. John and his father Daniel, a Revolutionary War veteran, pioneered in Alabama before John's conversion to Mormonism. A year before the first LDS migration, in the spring of 1846, he departed west with his extended family joining other converts that made up the Mississippi Company led by John Brown. They had been led to expect to meet the main party on the trail but after going as far as Laramie without a sign of them they went south and wintered at Pueblo, Colorado where they were later joined by the Mormon Battalion sick detachments. They had not gotten the word that Brigham Young's departure had been delayed by a year.

Holladay is the oldest continuously inhabited settlement in Utah, since Salt Lake City was abandoned for a time in 1857 when Johnston's Army occupied the city.

Cottonwood, a nearby settlement, was always associated with "Holladay's Burgh," and the area was first designated "Big Cottonwood," and later, as one of Salt Lake County's unincorporated communities, as "Holladay-Cottonwood".

Another center of settlement is the area settled in the mid-19th century by Rasmus Knudsen, now known as Knudsen's Corner. This area lies in the extreme southeastern corner of the city and is split with neighboring Cottonwood Heights.

In the 1960s the Cottonwood Mall was constructed in Holladay, it being Utah's first enclosed shopping mall. The  mall was closed down in 2007 after a plan to turn the mall into a European-style outdoor shopping village was announced.

The city was incorporated on November 29, 1999 as Holladay-Cottonwood, and the name was shortened to Holladay on December 14 of that year. Holladay City operated under the "strong mayor" form of government from 1999 until 2003, when the "council-manager" form was adopted. The mayors of Holladay have been Liane Stillman (1999 to 2001), Dennis Larkin (2001 to 2003), Dennis Webb (2003 to 2014) and Robert Dahle (2014 to present). The city's first manager was Randy Fitts (2003 to 2016). Members of the City Council have included Edward D.P. Lunt, Sandy Thackeray, Steven Peterson, Jim Palmer, Grant Orton, Daniel Bay Gibbons, Jeffrey Fishman, Hugo Diederich, Lynn Pace and Patricia Pignanelli. Known for its fine old homes, heavily wooded lots, the controlling of commercial development and the preservation of open space have been the chief political issues in Holladay's recent history. 

Holladay has experienced growth via 4 annexations. Expanded borders attribute to the bulk of Holladay's residential growth, the most recent being in 2015. As Holladay shares borders with neighboring cities of Murray, City of Millcreek and Cottonwood Heights, the municipal boundaries are established.

Demographics

According to estimates from the U.S. Census Bureau, as of 2020, there were 31,965 people in Holladay. The racial makeup of the county was 89.4% non-Hispanic White, 1.4% Black, 0.1% Native American, 2.0% Asian, 0.2% Pacific Islander, and 1.4% from two or more races. 5.7% of the population were Hispanic or Latino of any race.

Local media
 The Cottonwood/Holladay City Journal, newspaper, tabloid style newspaper covering local government, schools, sports, and features.

Notable people
 Duncan Spears Casper - pioneer
 Michael Embley - politician
 Mitt Romney - politician
 Paul W Draper - anthropologist, magician, mentalist

See also

 List of cities and towns in Utah

References

External links

 

Wasatch Front
Cities in Utah
Cities in Salt Lake County, Utah
Former census-designated places in Utah
Populated places established in 1847
Salt Lake City metropolitan area
1847 establishments in Utah